The 1891 Furman Baptists football team represented Furman University as an independent during the 1891 college football season. Led by first-year head coach H. P. Young, Furman compiled a record of 0–1.

Schedule

References

Furman
Furman Paladins football seasons
College football winless seasons
Furman Baptists football